George E. Little is a former Assistant to the Secretary of Defense for Public Affairs for the U.S. Department of Defense and was replaced by Brent Colburn. He was appointed to his position on July 19, 2011.

Professional career 
Little was appointed director of public affairs at the Central Intelligence Agency in October 2010, where he served as the CIA's chief media spokesman, provided strategic counsel to the director and his senior leadership team, coordinated internal communications to CIA employees in the United States and abroad, and managed communications and outreach to the American public.  Little began his communications work at the CIA in April 2007 as chief of media relations.

From 2005 to 2007, he worked in the National Counterterrorism Center's (NCTC) Directorate of Strategic Operational Planning, where he led the development of the congressionally-mandated National Strategy to Combat Terrorist Travel, and headed an interagency group responsible for assessing the U.S. government's progress in the fight against al-Qaeda and other terrorist groups.

Little previously worked as an intelligence community and business consultant with Booz Allen Hamilton and IBM.

Education 

Little received his doctorate in international relations, with distinction, from Georgetown University (where he has also served as an adjunct professor of international relations and international law) and his master's and bachelor's degrees from the University of Virginia.  He is a 1990 graduate of Thomas Jefferson High School for Science and Technology.

Personal life 
His wife, Bethany Little, served as chief education counsel for the chairman of the U.S. Senate Committee on Health, Education, Labor, and Pensions, and now works for EducationCounsel. They have two sons.

References

External links 

DoD Biography

United States Department of Defense officials
Living people
Georgetown University alumni
University of Virginia alumni
United States Assistant Secretaries of Defense
Year of birth missing (living people)